Menzel Heurr Airfield is an abandoned World War II military airfield in Tunisia, which is located approximately 22 km north-northeast of Korba and 60 km east-southeast of Tunis.  It was a temporary airfield built for fighter and light bomber use by the United States Army Air Force Ninth Air Force during the North African Campaign.

The airfield was used primarily by the 324th Fighter Group, which flew Curtiss P-40 Warhawks from the airfield in August 1943.   After the Americans moved out, the airfield was dismantled and abandoned.  Today, the remains of the main runway can be seen in aerial photography.

References

Further reading
 Maurer, Maurer. Air Force Combat Units of World War II. Maxwell AFB, Alabama: Office of Air Force History, 1983. 521 p..*

External links

Airfields of the United States Army Air Forces in Tunisia
World War II airfields in Tunisia
Airports established in 1943